Spy Hill Power Plant is a natural gas-fired station owned by Northland Power, in Spy Hill, Saskatchewan, Canada. The plant operates as a power peaking plant, complete with synchronous condense (voltage control), under a 25-year power purchase agreement with SaskPower. Construction started on the project in 2009, and was completed in October 2011. The plant was built using two General Electric LM 6000 gas turbines. Construction of the plant was expected to cost $145 million.

Description 
The Power Station consists of two turbines (supplied by General Electric LM6000), that operate in a simple cycle configuration. The operations team is as follows:

Site Lead, I&C Technologist - Dallas Wiley; 
Electrical Technologist - Dean Currie; 
Chief Engineer - Keith McKay

References

External links 

 Station Description

Natural gas-fired power stations in Saskatchewan